The best-selling Belgian music artists cannot be listed officially, as there is no organization that has recorded global music sales of Belgian artists. This page lists those artists who have had claims made to be among the top sellers.

Belgian artists by reputed sales 1940- Present

50 million records or more 
{| class="wikitable sortable" 
!width="25"| № !! style="width:250px;"|Artist !! style="width:150px;"|Sales (in millions) !! style="width:150px;"|Period!! style="width:150px;"|Genre !! style="width:150px;"|Source
|-
| 1 || Salvatore Adamo || style="text-align:center;"|100 more || style="text-align:center;"|1963–present || style="text-align:center;"|Chanson ||
|}

20 million records or more 
{| class="wikitable sortable" 
!width="25"| № !! style="width:250px;"|Artist !! style="width:150px;"|Sales (in millions) !! style="width:150px;"|Period!! style="width:150px;"|Genre !! style="width:150px;"|Source
|-
| 2 || Frédéric François || style="text-align:center;"|40  || style="text-align:center;"|1970–present || style="text-align:center;"|Chanson || 
|-
| 3 || Jacques Brel || style="text-align:center;"|25 || style="text-align:center;"|1953-1978† || style="text-align:center;"|Chanson || 
|-
| 4 || Lou Deprijck/Plastic Bertrand || style="text-align:center;"|20 || style="text-align:center;"| 1963–present || style="text-align:center;"|Pop/Rock || 
|-
   
|}

10 million records or more 
{| class="wikitable sortable" 
!width="25"| № !! style="width:250px;"|Artist !! style="width:150px;"|Sales (in millions) !! style="width:150px;"|Period!! style="width:150px;"|Genre !! style="width:150px;"|Source
|-
| 5 || Rocco Granata || style="text-align:center;"|17 || style="text-align:center;"|1959–present || style="text-align:center;"|Pop ||
|-
| 6 || Francis Goya || style="text-align:center;"| 15 || style="text-align:center;"|1966–present || style="text-align:center;"|Instrumental ||
 |-
| 7 || Frank Michael || style="text-align:center;"|15 || style="text-align:center;"|1974–present || style="text-align:center;"|Pop ||
|-
| 8 || Technotronic || style="text-align:center;"|14 || style="text-align:center;"|1988–2005 || style="text-align:center;"|Eurodance || 
|-
| 9 || Helmut Lotti || style="text-align:center;"|13.3  || style="text-align:center;"| 1990–present  || style="text-align:center;"|Pop || 
|-
| 10 || Lara Fabian || style="text-align:center;"|13 || style="text-align:center;"|1986–present  || style="text-align:center;"|Pop || 
|-
| 11 || Claude Barzotti || style="text-align:center;"|12 || style="text-align:center;"|1973–present || style="text-align:center;"|Pop ||
|-
| 12 || Vaya Con Dios || style="text-align:center;"|10.5 || style="text-align:center;"|1986–2014 || style="text-align:center;"|Pop ||
|-
| 13 || Art Sullivan || style="text-align:center;"|10.4 || style="text-align:center;"| 1966–present || style="text-align:center;"|Chanson || 
|}

5 million records or more 
{| class="wikitable sortable" 
!width="25"| № !! style="width:250px;"|Artist !! style="width:150px;"|Sales (in millions) !! style="width:150px;"|Period!! style="width:150px;"|Genre !! style="width:150px;"|Source
|-
| 14 || André Brasseur || style="text-align:center;"|7 || style="text-align:center;"|1965–present || style="text-align:center;"|Instrumental || 
|-
| 15 || Lio || style="text-align:center;"|7 || style="text-align:center;"|1979–present || style="text-align:center;"|Pop || 
|-
| 16 || Tony Sandler || style="text-align:center;"|6 || style="text-align:center;"|1949–present || style="text-align:center;"|Pop ||
|-
| 17 || Annie Cordy || style="text-align:center;"|5.5 || style="text-align:center;"|1960–2000 || style="text-align:center;"|Pop ||
|-
| 18 || Axelle Red || style="text-align:center;"|5.2 || style="text-align:center;"| 1987–present || style="text-align:center;"|Pop || 
|-
| 19 || Lasgo || style="text-align:center;"|5 || style="text-align:center;"|2000–present || style="text-align:center;"|Dance || 
|-
| 20 || Bobbejaan Schoepen || style="text-align:center;"|5 || style="text-align:center;"|1938–2010† || style="text-align:center;"| Pop || 
|-
| 21 || Eddy Wally || style="text-align:center;"|5 || style="text-align:center;"|1959–2016† || style="text-align:center;"|Ambiance || 
|-
|22 ||Stromae || style="text-align:center;" | 5 || style="text-align:center;" | 2005–present || style="text-align:center;" | Hip Hop/Dance ||
|}

2 million records or more 
{| class="wikitable sortable" 
!width="25"| № !! style="width:250px;"|Artist !! style="width:150px;"|Sales (in millions) !! style="width:150px;"|Period!! style="width:150px;"|Genre !! style="width:150px;"|Source
|-
| 23 || K3 || style="text-align:center;"|4.6 || style="text-align:center;"|1999–present || style="text-align:center;"|Pop || 
|-
| 24 || J.J. Lionel || style="text-align:center;"|4.5|| style="text-align:center;"|1970–present || style="text-align:center;"|Pop||
|-
| 25 || Ian Van Dahl/Annagrace || style="text-align:center;"|4.3|| style="text-align:center;"|2000–present || style="text-align:center;"|Dance || 
|-
| 26 || Paradisio || style="text-align:center;"|4.1 || style="text-align:center;"| 1994–present || style="text-align:center;"|Dance || 
|-
| 27 || Les Crazy Horse/Alain Delorme || style="text-align:center;"|4 || style="text-align:center;"|1971–1975 || style="text-align:center;"|Pop || 
|-
| 28 || Confetti's/T-Spoon || style="text-align:center;"|4 || style="text-align:center;"| 1982–present || style="text-align:center;"|New Beat/Dance || 
|-
| 29 || The Wallace Collection || style="text-align:center;"|4 || style="text-align:center;"| 1968–present|| style="text-align:center;"|Pop/rock ||
|-
| 30 || Benny B || style="text-align:center;"|3.5|| style="text-align:center;"|1990–present || style="text-align:center;"|Eurodance || 
|-
| 31 || Soeur Sourire || style="text-align:center;"|3.5 || style="text-align:center;"|1963-1983† || style="text-align:center;"|Pop || 
|-
| 32 || DJ F.R.A.N.K./Van Rijswijk/Danzel || style="text-align:center;"|3.3 || style="text-align:center;"|1999–present || style="text-align:center;"|Dance || 
|-
| 33 || Maurane || style="text-align:center;"|3.2|| style="text-align:center;"|1979–2018†|| style="text-align:center;"|Pop ||

|-
| 34 || Clouseau || style="text-align:center;"|3.1 || style="text-align:center;"|1984–present || style="text-align:center;"|Pop ||
|-
| 35 || Christian Vidal || style="text-align:center;"|3.1|| style="text-align:center;"|1972–present || style="text-align:center;"|Pop || 
|-
| 36 || Junior Jack || style="text-align:center;"|3 || style="text-align:center;"|1990–present || style="text-align:center;"|Eurodance || 
|-
| 37 || Kate Ryan || style="text-align:center;"|3 || style="text-align:center;"|2000–present|| style="text-align:center;"|Pop/Dance/House ||
|-
| 38 || K's Choice || style="text-align:center;"|3 || style="text-align:center;"|1990–present || style="text-align:center;"|Rock ||
|-
| 39 || Lords of Acid/Praga Khan || style="text-align:center;"|2.9 || style="text-align:center;"|1988–present || style="text-align:center;"|Acid house || 
|-
| 40 || Soulwax/2 many dj's || style="text-align:center;"|2.7|| style="text-align:center;"|1995–Present || style="text-align:center;"|Rock/Dance ||
|-
| 41 || Django Reinhardt || style="text-align:center;"|2.5 || style="text-align:center;"|1934-1953† || style="text-align:center;"|Jazz || 
|-
| 42 || Front 242 || style="text-align:center;"|2.5 || style="text-align:center;"|1980–present|| style="text-align:center;"|Electro || 
|-
| 43 || Jimmy Frey || style="text-align:center;"|(2.5) || style="text-align:center;"|1956–present|| style="text-align:center;"|Pop || 
|-
| 44 || Toots Thielemans || style="text-align:center;"|2.5 || style="text-align:center;"|1940–2016†|| style="text-align:center;"|Jazz/Instrumental || 
|-
| 45 || Henri Seroka || style="text-align:center;"|2.2 || style="text-align:center;"|1969–present|| style="text-align:center;"|Film music/Pop || 
|-
| 46 || Milow || style="text-align:center;"|2.2 || style="text-align:center;"|2003–present|| style="text-align:center;"|Pop || 
|-
| 47 || Dana Winner || style="text-align:center;"|2.15 || style="text-align:center;"|1989–present|| style="text-align:center;"|Pop || 
|-
| 48 || D.H.T. || style="text-align:center;"|2.1 || style="text-align:center;"|1995–present|| style="text-align:center;"|Trance/Eurodance || 
|-
| 49 || Milk Inc./Regi Penxten || style="text-align:center;"|2.1|| style="text-align:center;"|1996–present|| style="text-align:center;"|Electronica/House || 
|-
| 50 || Burt Blanca || style="text-align:center;"|2 || style="text-align:center;"|1958–present|| style="text-align:center;"|Rock'n'roll || 
|-
| 51 || Christian Adam || style="text-align:center;"|2|| style="text-align:center;"|1973–present|| style="text-align:center;"|Pop  || 
|-
| 52 || Philippe Lafontaine || style="text-align:center;"|2 || style="text-align:center;"|1978–present|| style="text-align:center;"|Pop || 
|-
| 53 || M.I.K.E. || style="text-align:center;"|2 || style="text-align:center;"|1992–present|| style="text-align:center;"|Trance || 
|-
| 54 || Soulsister/Jan Leyers/Paul Michiels || style="text-align:center;"|2|| style="text-align:center;"|1986-1997, 2007|| style="text-align:center;"|Pop || 
|}

Note - Numbers may not be accurate. International album and single sales were counted.

Notes

Sources 
 The official websites of the artists
 IFPI
 History of the Belgian music industry
 Best selling Belgian artists

Belgian music
Belgian artists